Saleh bin Abdullah Al-Qadhi (Arabic: صالح بن عبد الله القاضي, born January 11, 1959) is current Mayor of 'Asir Region, Saudi Arabia. He is the former Acting Mayor of Medina and previously served in the 'Asir Region communal council.

He has over thirty years of experience in private and public sectors. He received a bachelor's degree in Agricultural engineering from King Faisal University, al-Hasa.

Al-Qadhi is committed to provide the citizens improved infrastructures and recently implementing a major public transportation program for commuter, tram, water ferries, buses, bridges and stations. He is encouraging PPP to provide projects for housing, commercial development, leisure and recreational.

Biography

Early life and education 
Al-Qadhi, born on January 11, 1959, in Medina, Saudi Arabia, he graduated high school from Medina. Al-Qadhi received a B.S. from King Faisal University in Agricultural engineering.

References 

Living people
Saudi Arabian Muslims
Mayors of places in Saudi Arabia
People from Medina
King Faisal University alumni
1959 births